Elena Tomas (born 11 January 1961 in Moscow) is a former individual rhythmic gymnast who competed for the Soviet Union. She is the 1979 World All-around silver medalist.

Career 
Tomas made her breakthrough amongst the many Soviet rhythmic gymnasts of her time in 1979 when she competed at the 1979 World Championships. She won silver in All-around, gold in Ribbon and another silver in Rope. She repeated her success in 1980 at the European Championships and Soviet Championships.

Tomas lives and coaches in Spain.

External links

Image Gallery from Ukraine RG

1961 births
Living people
Gymnasts from Moscow
Russian rhythmic gymnasts
Soviet rhythmic gymnasts
Medalists at the Rhythmic Gymnastics World Championships